Jack Tales  may refer to:

 Jack tales, a traditional English and Appalachian folklore genre
 "Jack Tales", an episode of the animated TV series "Samurai Jack"